was a town located in Munakata District, Fukuoka Prefecture, Japan.

As of 2003, the town had an estimated population of 41,719 and a density of 1,417.57 persons per km². The total area was 29.43 km².

On January 24, 2005, Fukuma, along with the town of Tsuyazaki (also from Munakata District), was merged to create the city of Fukutsu.

External links
Fukuma official website of Fukutsu in Japanese

Dissolved municipalities of Fukuoka Prefecture
Populated places disestablished in 2006
2006 disestablishments in Japan